Hypsibarbus pierrei is a species of freshwater ray-finned fish in the genus Hypsibarbus native to rivers in Mainland Southeast Asia.

References 

Fish of Thailand
Pierrei
Fish described in 1880